Alena Rojas Orta (born 9 August 1992) is a Cuban volleyball player. She is a member of the Cuba women's national volleyball team.

She was part of the Cuban national team at the 2014 FIVB Volleyball Women's World Championship in Italy.  She played for La Habana in 2014.

Clubs
  Santiago De Cuba (2010-2014)
  La Habana (2014-2015)
  Tulitsa (since 2018)

References

External links

1992 births
Living people
Cuban women's volleyball players
Place of birth missing (living people)
Volleyball players at the 2011 Pan American Games
Volleyball players at the 2015 Pan American Games
Pan American Games silver medalists for Cuba
Pan American Games medalists in volleyball
Middle blockers
Expatriate volleyball players in Russia
Cuban expatriates in Russia
Medalists at the 2011 Pan American Games
21st-century Cuban women